The P.K was a car made by Pars Khodro between 2000 and 2005 using the body of the first-generation Renault 5 and the engine of the Kia Pride. "P.K" is an acronym for Pars Khodro.
After 24 years of manufacture of the Renault 5 as the Sepand in Iran by SAIPA then Pars Khodro from 1976 to 2000, Pars Khodro updated the model with a Renault 5 body and kia pride engine. The Renault 5 bodywork was further modified and additional amenities were added, such as air conditioning. The result was the P.K. Manufacture of the P.K continued until it was replaced by the New P.K in 2005.

New P.K. 

The New P.K. is a car made by Pars Khodro, with a body similar to a first generation Renault 5 and the platform/engine of a Kia Pride.
P.K is an acronym for Pars Khodro (the manufacturer).

Manufacture of the New P.K. commenced in 2005. The New P.K is different in body style from the previous P.K. models which had a very similar body to the Renault 5. the production was ended in 2007

PK

New PK

External links 
 

Cars of Iran
Front-wheel-drive vehicles
Hatchbacks